Right Of Way/20th Street station is a light rail stop on the Muni Metro J Church line, located in the southwest corner of Dolores Park in San Francisco, California. The stop opened with the line on August 11, 1917. The station has two side platforms where passengers board or depart from trains. The stop is not accessible to people with disabilities.

The stop is also served by the  route which provides service along the J Church line during the early morning when trains do not operate.

In March 2014, Muni released details of the proposed implementation of their Transit Effectiveness Project (later rebranded MuniForward), which included a variety of stop changes for the J Church line. No changes were proposed for the stop at 20th Street.

References

External links 

SFMTA – Right Of Way/20th St inbound and outbound
SFBay Transit (unofficial) – Right Of Way/20th St

Mission District, San Francisco
Muni Metro stations
Railway stations in the United States opened in 1917